Rouay Jebabli (born 17 November 1997) is a Tunisian para-athlete who specializes in middle-distance running. He represented Tunisia at the 2020 Summer Paralympics.

Career
Jebabli represented Tunisia in the men's 1500 metres T13 event at the 2020 Summer Paralympics and won a silver medal.

References

1997 births
Living people
Paralympic athletes of Tunisia
Athletes (track and field) at the 2020 Summer Paralympics
Medalists at the 2020 Summer Paralympics
Paralympic silver medalists for Tunisia
Paralympic medalists in athletics (track and field)
People from Kef Governorate
Tunisian male middle-distance runners
21st-century Tunisian people